Kochkoma is a settlement and a railway junction in Segezhsky District of the Republic of Karelia, Russia.

The settlement is connected to Ledmozero by the Ledmozero–Kochkoma Railway, a part of the Oktyabrskaya Railway system.

References

Rural localities in the Republic of Karelia
Segezhsky District